CancerResource is  database of drug-target relationships related to cancer.

See also
 COSMIC cancer database
 Databases for oncogenomic research

References

External links
 https://web.archive.org/web/20110718210257/http://bioinf-data.charite.de/cancerresource/

Biological databases
Cancer research